Daniyar Attokurov is a Kyrgyzstani politician, the head of the national headquarters of the Social Democratic Party of Kyrgyzstan. He is a member of the Kyrgyzstan parliament.

References 

Living people
Year of birth missing (living people)
Social Democratic Party of Kyrgyzstan politicians